Ranulf fitz Walter, also known as Randolph fitz Walter, was a prominent 11th-century noble. A Norman knight, Ranulf participated in William, Duke of Normandy's invasion of England in 1066. He obtained lands of Norfolk and Suffolk in England from Roger Bigod as tenant in chief. Ranulf was succeeded by his eldest son Gibert.

Marriage and issue
Ranulf married Matilda, daughter of Ralph I de Langetot, they are known to have had the following issue:
Gilbert fitz Ranulf, married Richildis.
Agnes fille Ranulf, married Robert II de Vaux of Pentney, had issue.
Simon fitz Ranulf.

Notes

Citations

References
 

11th-century English people